Jackson Township is one of the nineteen townships of Guernsey County, Ohio, United States. As of the 2010 census the population was 5,220, of whom 2,782 lived in the unincorporated portion of the township.

Geography
Located in the southwestern part of the county, it borders the following townships:
Cambridge Township - north
Center Township - northeast
Richland Township - east
Valley Township - south
Spencer Township - southwest
Westland Township - west

The village of Byesville is located in central Jackson Township, and the southern end of the city of Cambridge is in the northern part of the township.

Name and history
Jackson Township was organized in 1824, and named for General Andrew Jackson, afterward seventh President of the United States. It is one of thirty-seven Jackson Townships statewide.

Schools
Children from Jackson Township would have attended these schools in the early to mid 1900s: Ideal School, Happy Dale School, Garfield School (A.K.A. Stop Nine School), Lincoln School, Central (High) School and Byesville High (Elementary) School. The current public schools of the township are made up from the Rolling Hills Local School District: Byesville Elementary School, Brook Intermediate School, Meadowbrook Middle School and Meadowbrook High School.

Government
The township is governed by a three-member board of trustees, who are elected in November of odd-numbered years to a four-year term beginning on the following January 1. Two are elected in the year after the presidential election and one is elected in the year before it. There is also an elected township fiscal officer, who serves a four-year term beginning on April 1 of the year after the election, which is held in November of the year before the presidential election. Vacancies in the fiscal officership or on the board of trustees are filled by the remaining trustees.

References

External links
County website

Townships in Guernsey County, Ohio
Townships in Ohio